USS Palawan (ARG-10) was a Luzon class internal combustion engine repair ship that saw service in the United States Navy during the final days of World War II, and in the post-war period. It was named for Palawan island in the Philippines.

Palawan, built as MCE hull 2668 by the Bethlehem-Fairfield, MD, was launched 12 August 1944; sponsored by Mrs. Louis Augustine; converted to an internal combustion engine repair ship at Bethlehem Key Highway Shipyard, Baltimore; and commissioned 3 May 1945.

Following shakedown in Chesapeake Bay, Palawan took on ammunition and stores at Norfolk and sailed for Panama 12 June. Transiting the Panama Canal on the 19th, it continued on into the Pacific, arriving at Tacloban, Philippines, 3 August. A unit of ServDiv 101, it repaired small craft, giving priority to minesweepers, in San Pedro Bay until 1 September. On that date it steamed north to join ServDiv 103 and support the ships of Task Force 52 during Western Japan minesweeping operations. Until 10 March 1946 it repaired ships at Sasebo, then shifted to Shanghai, remaining there until the end of April when it returned to the United States. Arriving at San Diego, CA in June, it underwent inactivation, decommissioned, 15 January 1947, and was berthed there in the Pacific Reserve Fleet. Palawan remained at San Diego until transferred to the Maritime Administration’s National Defense Reserve Fleet at Suisun Bay, CA, 23 February 1962. The repair ship was sold to the State of California Ship Reef Program on 1 November 1976.  In 1977 Palawan was sunk off of Redondo Beach, CA as an artificial reef.

References

External links
Photo Gallery of USS Palawan at NavSource Naval History

 

Ships built in Baltimore
1944 ships
Luzon-class repair ships
World War II auxiliary ships of the United States